Jacqueline Parker may refer to:
 Jacqui Parker (born 1966), English athlete
 Jacqueline Parker (politician), Arizona state representative